Lennon Ray Louise Stella (born August 13, 1999) is a Canadian singer and actress. She portrayed Maddie Conrad on the musical-drama series Nashville (2012–2018). Before going solo in 2018, Stella performed with her sister as the duo Lennon & Maisy. Stella released her debut EP Love, Me in 2018. Her debut studio album Three. Two. One. was released in 2020.

Career 
In January 2018, it was announced that Lennon had signed a record deal with Records and Columbia Records. In 2018, Lennon featured on the track "Polaroid" with Jonas Blue and Liam Payne. On November 16, 2018, Lennon released her debut EP titled Love, Me featuring previously released singles "Bad", "Breakaway", and "Fortress". This EP kickstarted her solo music career.

In May and June 2019, Lennon opened for Anne-Marie on her Speak Your Mind tour. She collaborated with The Chainsmokers and Illenium for a single titled "Takeaway" which was released on July 24, 2019.

In 2019, Lennon toured as an opening act with 5 Seconds of Summer for the Chainsmokers' World War Joy Tour.

In February 2020, Lennon won a Juno Award for Breakthrough Artist of the Year, making this the first award she has received.

In January 2022, she performed a cover of "Hey, Beautiful" by The Solids for as the theme song for the spin-off How I Met Your Father.

Artistry 
Lennon Stella is mainly described as an indie pop and pop musician whose music is "R&B tinged". Her debut EP is described as a dance-club record.

Discography

Studio albums

Extended plays

Singles

As lead artist

As featured artist

Promotional singles

Other appearances

Music videos

Tours

Headlining 

 Love, Me Tour (2019)
 Lennon Stella: Live In Concert (2019–20)
 Three. Two. One: The Tour (2020) [CANCELED]

Festivals 

 Lollapalooza (2019)
 Bonnaroo Music Festival (2020)

Supporting 

 Speak Your Mind Tour – Anne-Marie (2019)
 World War Joy Tour – The Chainsmokers (2019)

Filmography

Notes

References 

1999 births
Living people
Actresses from Oshawa
Canadian child actresses
Canadian television actresses
Musicians from Oshawa
21st-century Canadian actresses
Juno Award for Breakthrough Artist of the Year winners
21st-century Canadian women singers